Liz Phair is the fourth studio album by the American singer-songwriter Liz Phair, released on June 24, 2003, on Capitol Records. It was produced by Phair with Michael Penn, Pete Yorn, R. Walt Vincent and the Matrix songwriting team.

Liz Phair departed from Phair's earlier lo-fi sound for more polished pop production and songwriting. Phair said she wanted to earn more money from her work, and hired the Matrix, who had produced songs by pop acts including Britney Spears, the Backstreet Boys, Ricky Martin and Avril Lavigne. The Matrix co-wrote four songs, including the singles "Extraordinary" and "Why Can't I?".

Liz Phair debuted at #27 on the Billboard 200. "Why Can't I?" entered the Adult Top 40 and Hot Adult Contemporary charts, and its music video placed Phair in heavy rotation on VH1 for the first time. The album received mixed reviews, including negative reviews from the New York Times and Pitchfork, who both accused Phair of selling out and mimicking younger artists. In 2019, the Pitchfork critic Matt LeMay apologized for his review, saying he had failed to appreciate Phair's willingness to try different approaches. By July 2010, Liz Phair had sold 433,000 copies. It was certified gold in the United States in 2018.

Background
Phair released her debut album, Exile in Guyville, in 1993. With a raw, lo-fi sound and "punk-feminist" lyrics, it was acclaimed by critics and was eventually certified gold. Her subsequent albums Whip-Smart (1994) and Whitechocolatespaceegg (1998) were less successful.

In 1999, the major record label Capitol acquired Matador, the independent label that had released Phair's albums. Phair said the acquisition complicated her work, as it gave her "12 more people I had to talk to on top of the people I was already talking to, who had different aims themselves". The Matador staff she had worked with left, leaving her under pressure at Capitol. Phair described seeing manufactured bands achieve success while she had no "indie-cool group" to advise her. According to Phair, the CEO of Capitol, Andy Slater, told her: "I'm giving you a shot and if you don't take the shot, there's nothing much I can do for you."

For her fourth album, Phair - by this point in her 30s - wanted to "feel more like an entrepreneur, not just a dumb artist", and be better rewarded for her work. She said: "I think with many artists there is a gambling spirit – just get out there and don't watch out for yourself – and I think it's a very unhealthy attitude to assume that you're not in business when you actually are."

Recording 
Phair worked with several producers, including Michael Penn, who had worked with acts including Aimee Mann and the Wallflowers. Phair and Penn worked in the Capitol Records Building in Los Angeles. Phair said in October 2001, "He places me in it so beautifully. He'll do things like get an industrial sound and replace it for a snare drum. It's one of the most intense-sounding things I've ever done." The collaboration with Penn ended as, according to Phair, "He tended to like my more serious stuff and he wouldn't let me make a fool of myself, and I really needed to make a little bit of a fool of myself."

Searching for "more spontaneous stuff", Phair recruited the Matrix songwriting and production team, who had created songs for pop acts including Britney Spears, the Backstreet Boys, Ricky Martin and Avril Lavigne. Phair said she was envious of Lavigne's 2002 song "Complicated", and said: "How come I don't ever get to make songs that are blasted out of cars? That's one of the things I've always done my whole life is drive fast and play music loud."

The Matrix wrote and produced four songs with Phair: "Extraordinary", "Why Can't I?", "Rock Me" and "Favorite". Phair said they pushed her to sing different kinds of melodies: "It's top-of-the-line song structure, and it was really exciting to graft my DNA with theirs and to see what we came up with." Other tracks were produced by Penn, Pete Yorn and Yorn's producer R. Walt Vincent.

Phair deliberated over whether to include the song "HWC", which stands for "hot white cum". She said she wrote it "completely sincerely ... I'm talking about being in love and having great sex." She said her female friends loved the song, but that "grown men had a lot of problems with it".

Reception
Liz Phair debuted at #27 on the Billboard 200. The single "Why Can't I?" entered the Adult Top 40 and Hot Adult Contemporary charts, and its music video placed Phair in heavy rotation on VH1 for the first time. By July 2010, Liz Phair had sold 433,000 copies. It was certified gold in the United States on May 14, 2018, for sales of 500,000 copies.
The album received polarizing reactions. On the review aggregator site Metacritic, Liz Phair has a score of 40 out of 100, indicating "mixed or average reviews". The polished pop production and songwriting, a departure from Phair's earlier work, alienated many listeners. According to the Washington Post, Liz Phair "inspired some of the most vitriolic music press in ages, with bad (and surprisingly personal) reviews outgunning the occasional good ones by a huge margin". Many accused Phair of selling out, and she became a "piñata for critics", according to The New York Times.

The New York Times critic Meghan O'Rourke titled her review "Liz Phair's Exile in Avril-ville", and complained that Phair "gushes like a teenager", having "committed an embarrassing form of career suicide". Matt LeMay of Pitchfork rated the album 0.0, writing, "It's sad that an artist as groundbreaking as Phair would be reduced to cheap publicity stunts and hyper-commercialized teen-pop." The PopMatters critic Adrien Begrand wrote that it was "a highly overproduced, shallow, soulless, confused, pop-by-numbers disaster that betrays everything the woman stood for a decade ago, and most heinously, betrays all her original fans".

Reviewing for Entertainment Weekly, Chris Willman described Liz Phair as "an honestly fun summer disc", noting "Little Digger" and "Rock Me" as highlights. Slant critic Sal Cinquemani also praised the album, calling Phair "frank and funny" and citing "It's Sweet", "My Bionic Eyes", and "Rock Me" as noteworthy tracks. Robert Christgau wrote in The Village Voice that it included "no bad songs", and credited Phair for "successfully fusing the personal and the universal, challenging lowest-common-denominator values even as it fellates them". The Rolling Stone critic Barry Walters wrote that "Rock Me" and "Little Dagger" matched the "lofty songwriting standard" of Exile in Guyville, and concluded: "Phair is a fine lyricist, and although she's lost some musical identity, she's gained potential Top Forty access."

Retrospective 

In 2018, Travis Morrison, who also received a 0.0 score from Pitchfork for his 2004 album Travistan, said he thought Liz Phair was Phair's "most visionary gesture". He wrote: "Now hipsters listen to Carly Rae Jepsen and no one thinks about it. But Liz Phair was pretty ahead of that curve. And she really got some nasty shit about it."

In 2019, Phair said she felt O'Rourke's New York Times review had attempted to shame her for dressing and acting sexually as a mother and for trying to reach a broader audience. She said: "Meghan ought to try wearing some hot clothes and having a good time. She might be happier." She said her experience with the album had been "challenging, but good", and that it had helped her "grow a lot as a performer. I did something I was scared to do, like finding my path in a whole new [way]. It's like moving to a new city and making new friends and trying to be a different person." Phair said she was "kind of proud" of the Pitchfork 0.0 rating.

In 2018, asked about the criticism Liz Phair had received from outlets such as Pitchfork, Christgau wrote:

In 2019, LeMay apologized on Twitter for his "condescending and cringey" Pitchfork review, writing:

Phair responded to LeMay on Twitter: "I've always enjoyed criticism well-rendered and the 0.0 had some humor to it — enjoyed it more than others I can tell you." In 2021, Pitchfork included Liz Phair on its list of album review scores they "would change if they could", upgrading its score to 6.0.

Track listing

Note
 "H.W.C." is omitted from clean versions of the album.

Personnel
Liz Phair – guitar, vocals, sampling
Jebin Bruni – keyboards
Mario Calire – drums
Lenny Castro – percussion
Matt Chamberlain – drums
Alison Clark – backing vocals
Mike Elizondo – bass
Victor Indrizzo – drums
Corky James – guitar, bass
Buddy Judge – guitar, electric guitar, backing vocals
Abe Laboriel Jr. – drums
The Matrix – vocals
Wendy Melvoin – bass, guitar
Michael Penn – bass, guitar, backing vocals, sampling
John Sands – drums
David Sutton – bass
R. Walt Vincent – bass, guitar, harmonica, electric guitar, backing vocals, Wurlitzer
Patrick Warren – piano, keyboards
The Wizardz of Oz – vocals
Pete Yorn – guitar, drums

Production
Producers: the Matrix, Michael Penn, R. Walt Vincent
Engineers: Doug Boehm, Ryan Freeland, The Matrix, Michael Penn, R. Walt Vincent, Howard Willing
Assistant engineer: Kevin Meeker
Mixing: Serban Ghenea, Tom Lord-Alge
Mastering: Ted Jensen, Eddy Schreyer
Assistant: Mike Glines, Andrew Nast
Arranger: The Matrix
Drum recordings: Krish Sharma
Design: Eric Roinestad
Art direction: Eric Roinestad
Photography: Phil Poynter

Charts

Weekly charts

Certifications

References

External links
 

2003 albums
Albums produced by the Matrix (production team)
Capitol Records albums
Liz Phair albums
Teen pop albums